Huang Yanpei is a Chinese historical television series based on the life of Huang Yanpei, a prominent educator, industrialist and politician who was also one of the founders of the China Democratic League. Directed by Hong Baosheng and Zhao Lei, the series starred Zhang Tielin as the eponymous character. The series was first broadcast on CCTV-8 in China on 27 May 2010.

Cast

 Zhang Tielin as Huang Yanpei
 Tang Guoqiang as Mao Zedong
 Liu Jin as Zhou Enlai
 Ma Xiaowei as Chiang Kai-shek
 Gu Wei as Chen Yi
 Zheng Weili as Wang Jiusi
 Hao Yang as Yao Weijun
 Mi Xuedong as Du Yuesheng
 Zhang Wei as Zhuang Ziyun
 Liu Yibing as Wang Qingli
 Xiao Daiqing as Shang Yimin
 Sun Meng as Sun Yutang
 Lei Zhenyu as Shi Liangcai
 Liu Xin as Shao Lizi
 Ma Rui as Lin Suyu
 Li Yusheng as Lu Hemei
 Liu Jingfan as Zuo Shunsheng
 Wang Shiwen as Wang Shijie
 Gai Mei as Leng Yu
 Peng Guobin as Huang Jingwu
 Wan Bin as Ding Dali
 Xu Guangming as Wu Zhongyou
 Li Zhi as Yang Chengqi
 Yu Yang as Zhang Zhizhong
 Cheng Cheng as Huang Yanpei's son
 Wang Jianjun as Gu Shoucheng
 Hou Tongjiang as Yang Sisheng
 Sui Cunyi as Lai Xiaodong
 Zheng Xilong as Yu A'shun
 Fu Xiaobo as Yu Guoquan
 Bai Hongbiao as Gu Junfan
 Qi Xiaoxiao as Huang Yanpei's daughter
 Liu Di as secret agency leader
 Yan Fengqi as Zhu De
 Xiao Guilin as Peng Dehuai
 Zhou Yemang as Sun Yat-sen
 Song Weihua as Wang Ruofei
 Lin Xin as Soong Ching-ling
 Li Ou as Fan Wenlan
 Li Bao'an as Gang Yejin
 Shen Tian as Assistant Xu
 Qi Zixuan as Worker Li
 Zhao Baozhu as Driver Ma
 Luo Yuan as Lanhua
 Liang Song as Cai Yuanpei
 An Ruiyun as Zhang Jian
 Bai Qiulin as Cheng Dequan
 Zhang Dongqiang as Zhang Zhidong
 Liu Jun as Zhang Xueliang
 Choenyi Tsering as Reporter
 Long as William Burke
 Zhang Jinliang as Chu Fucheng
 Cao Yuzhou as Zhang Bojun
 Zhang Hongtao as Fu Sinian
 Zhang Rihui as Hu Juewen
 Chen Zhenghua as Liang Shuming
 Li Qiaoke as Sun Qimeng
 Wang Yingming as Zhang Qun
 An Limin as Wang Genzhong
 Wan Zheng as Pan Hannian
 Liao Chongru as Zou Taofen
 Yang Chong as Zou Jialiu
 Zhao Lei as Ino Osamu
 Liu Xiaoxi as Wang Jingwei
 Feng Boming as Teshima
 Thomas as Thomas Edison
 Zhou Qing as guard commander
 Wang Weiwei as warden

Controversy
Around March 2009, when Huang Yanpei was still in production, it elicited strong criticism from Huang Fangyi, one of Huang Yanpei's sons. Huang Fangyi wrote on an online blog that his family members were extremely displeased with the historical inaccuracies and errors in the television series, and that they strongly objected to Zhang Tielin portraying his father on screen. Huang Fangyi elaborated further on these points:

 Zhang Tielin's public image and speech patterns – he has a strong Tianjin accent – does not match that of Huang Yanpei. Zhang is known for being a comedy actor so it is unsuitable for him to portray Huang Yanpei, who is known to be a serious man. It is also ironic and disrespectful to allow an actor of non-Chinese citizenship — Zhang became a British citizen in 1997 — to portray Huang Yanpei, who is known for his patriotism.
 Huang Yanpei's extramarital affair with Lin Suyu, a fictional character, is an insult to his moral character.
 Huang Yanpei was a vegetarian for most of his life but in one scene, he is shown eating maoxuewang.
 It is inappropriate for fictional characters such as Zhuang Ziyun and Shang Yimin to play significant roles in Huang Yanpei's life.
 The television series does not accurately reflect the struggles in Huang Yanpei's life. Some events in the series are historically inaccurate, such as his contributions to education and the economy. His relationship with the Chinese Communist Party is also inaccurately depicted.

Huang Fangyi mentioned that he had written to the producers, providing suggestions for changes. However, except for some kind words, he did not receive any response from them. He was not satisfied as he felt that the television series had emotionally affected his family, and said that they would continue to remain opposed to it.

References

External links
  Huang Yanpei official page on Sina.com

2010 Chinese television series debuts
2010 Chinese television series endings
Chinese period television series
Chinese documentary television series
Television series set in the Qing dynasty